The Archdeacon of Tonbridge is a senior ecclesiastical officer in charge of the Archdeaconry of Tonbridge in the Church of England Diocese of Rochester. The archdeaconry was created from Rochester archdeaconry by Order in Council on 4 April 1906.

The archdeaconry covers 6 deaneries, namely Malling, Paddock Wood, Sevenoaks, Shoreham, Tonbridge and Tunbridge Wells.

List of archdeacons
1906–18 June 1925 (d.): Avison Scott, Vicar of St James's Tunbridge Wells (first archdeacon)
1925–1940 (ret.): Leonard Savill (afterwards archdeacon emeritus)
1940–1953 (ret.): William Gray, Vicar of St Nicholas, Rochester (until 1942) then Vicar of Kippington (until 1952; afterwards archdeacon emeritus)
1953–1976 (ret.): Maples Earle, Rector of Wrotham (until 1959) then Vicar of Shipbourne (afterwards archdeacon emeritus)
1977–1995 (ret.): Richard Mason, Vicar of Edenbridge (until 1983) then Minister of St Luke's Sevenoaks (afterwards archdeacon emeritus)
1996–2002 (ret.): Judith Rose
200231 July 2017: Clive Mansell
24 September 201719 July 2021: Julie Conalty (became Bishop of Birkenhead)
16 January 2022 - current: Sharon Copestake

References

Diocese of Rochester
Anglican ecclesiastical offices
Lists of Anglicans
Lists of English people
Archdeacon of Tonbridge